The Second Cabinet of Lars Løkke Rasmussen was the Government of Denmark, in office between 28 June 2015 and 28 November 2016, where Lars Løkke Rasmussen third cabinet took over.

It was a single-party minority government consisting of Venstre, the first of this kind since Anker Jørgensen V Cabinet in 1981–82. It was supported by the Danish People's Party, the Liberal Alliance, and the Conservative People's Party.

List of ministers

|}

References

 

Rasmussen, Lars Lokke 2
2015 establishments in Denmark
Cabinets established in 2015
2016 disestablishments in Denmark
Cabinets disestablished in 2016